Donderen is a village in the Dutch province of Drenthe. It is a part of the municipality of Tynaarlo, and lies about 10 km north of Assen.

The village was first mentioned in 1276 as "Sigheri de Dunren". The etymology is unclear. Donderen was home to 267 people in 1840.

References

Populated places in Drenthe
Tynaarlo